James D. Watson Institute of Genome Sciences (Traditional Chinese: 浙江大學沃森基因組科學研究院, Simplified Chinese: 浙江大学沃森基因组科学研究院; abbr. WIGS), is a research institute of genomic science. It is located in Hangzhou City, Zhejiang Province, and affiliated to Zhejiang University in the People's Republic of China.

Introduction
The institute was named after the DNA structure co-discoverer Dr. James D. Watson.  The institute was founded on October 6, 2003, when Watson visited China, and was also the year of the fiftieth anniversary of Watson's discovery. Watson also wrote the title for the institute.

The institute was consulted from the American Cold Spring Harbor Laboratory, where Dr. Watson was the president. It is located in the Zhijiang Campus, Zhejiang University, close to the Qiantang River and has a very beautiful landscape.

The institute mainly offers postgraduate study. Currently there are about 80 master and PhD candidates. At present, Yang Huangming, academician of the CAS, is the acting director of the institute.

The institute collaborates with academic bodies from around the globe including the University of Copenhagen and Oxford University.

References

Research Center of Zhejiang University
James Watson